Gerhard "Gerry" Neef (30 October 1946 – 23 February 2010), often known as Gerhardt Neef, was a German professional footballer who played as a goalkeeper.

Career
Although Neef was taken to Scotland initially by Eddie Turnbull, manager of Aberdeen, he was best known for his spell at Scottish side Rangers, whom he signed for in spring 1968. A former German policeman, he was seen as the answer to the clubs problematic goalkeeping position. The manager Davie White had been struggling to find a replacement to Billy Ritchie since his departure in 1967, using Erik Sørensen and Norrie Martin but not settling on either.

He made his debut on 19 April 1969 in a league match against Greenock Morton, keeping a clean sheet in a 3–0 home win. The following season, he became first choice at the club playing 39 games and winning the 1970 League Cup, after keeping out Celtic F.C. in the final.

The 1970–71 season saw him lose his place to new signing Peter McCloy. His appearances were sporadic thereafter. He was part of the 1971–72 European Cup Winners' Cup squad, but never played. Neef left Rangers to return to West Germany in 1973, having made 48 appearances in total for the club.

Death
Neef died from throat cancer at his home in Nuremberg on 23 February 2010. A one-minute silence was held in respect for Neef before a match at Ibrox Stadium on 28 February 2010.

Personal life
Melanie Neef, Neef's daughter, was an athlete for Great Britain.

References

External links
 Career stats

1946 births
2010 deaths
People from Miesbach (district)
Sportspeople from Upper Bavaria
German footballers
Footballers from Bavaria
Association football goalkeepers
Scottish Football League players
2. Bundesliga players
Rangers F.C. players
1. FC Nürnberg players
Deaths from cancer in Germany
Deaths from esophageal cancer
German expatriate footballers
German expatriate sportspeople in Scotland
Expatriate footballers in Scotland